David Jeffrey Whitaker (born April 8, 1961) is an American attorney and politician serving as a member of the Arkansas House of Representatives for the 85th district. Whitaker was a candidate for Arkansas's 3rd congressional district in the 2010 election.

Early life and education
Raised in Georgia, Whitaker graduated from Granby High School in Norfolk, Virginia. Whitaker earned a Bachelor of Arts degree in geography from University of Mary Washington and a Juris Doctor from the University of Arkansas School of Law.

Career
He served in the United States Air Force from 1983 to 1989 reaching the rank of staff sergeant. While in the Air Force he served aboard the USNS Observation Island (T-AGM-23).

In 1992 he was an editorial research intern with the book division of the National Geographic Society in Washington, D.C.

During law school, he clerked for the Washington County prosecuting attorney and served on his law school's honor council. From 1999 to 2000 he served on the Washington County Domestic Violence Task Force. From 2001 to 2009 he served as an assistant city attorney for Fayetteville, Arkansas. From 2007 to 2009 he served as the chairman of the Washington County Democratic Party.

From 2011 to 2013 he was a member of the adjunct faculty at Northwest Arkansas Community College.

In 2013 he was elected to the Arkansas House of Representatives to represent the 85th District defeating Paul Graham.

Personal life
He resides in Fayetteville, Arkansas with his wife, Lisa and their two daughters.

Elections
2012 With District 85 incumbent Representative John Burris redistricted to District 98, Whitaker won the May 22, 2012 Democratic Primary with 1,264 votes (74.1%), and won the November 6, 2012 General election with 6,450 votes (56.0%) against Republican nominee Paul Graham.
2010 When Arkansas's 3rd Congressional District Representative John Boozman ran for United States Senate, Whitaker was unopposed for the May 18, 2010 Democratic Primary but lost the November 2, 2010 General election Republican nominee Steve Womack.

References

External links
Official page at the Arkansas House of Representatives
Campaign site

David Whitaker at Ballotpedia
David Whitaker at the National Institute on Money in State Politics

1961 births
21st-century American politicians
Living people
Democratic Party members of the Arkansas House of Representatives
Place of birth missing (living people)
Politicians from Fayetteville, Arkansas
United States Air Force airmen
University of Arkansas School of Law alumni
University of Mary Washington alumni